Dagger & Guitar is the 1983 third album by the Danish rock band Sort Sol (previously Sods) and the first of their records to carry the new name Sort Sol.

The album was, when it was released, often seen as the first "commercial" album for the band as it contained more listenable and catchier songs than the two previous albums. It was produced by the American producer Chris Butler. As with the previous records this was too reissued in 1997, though with a new cover.

Track listing 
All songs by Sort Sol (except where noted)
 "Abyss" – 3:48
 "White Shirt" – 3:08
 "Excalibur" – 1:46
 "Boy - Girl" – 2:39 (Torsten Høegh, Sort Sol)
 "Boy in the Fire" – 2:26
 "Off Morning" – 2:48
 "Written Story" – 3:05
 "Stuck to My Gun" – 2:48
 "Framelding" – 3:32
 "As She Weeps" – 7:55 (lyrics: Lydia Lunch; music: Sort Sol)

1997 re-release bonus tracks
 "El Toro" - 3:28 (Bill Giant, Bernie Baum, Florence Kaye)
 "I Heard a Forest Praying" - 2:25 (Sam Lewis, Peter de Rose)
 "The Sun Ain't Gonna Shine Anymore" - 3:18 (Bob Crowe, Bob Gaudio)
 "Ruby Don't Take Your Love to Town" - 3:04 (Mel Tillis)

Personnel 
Sort Sol
 Peter Peter – guitar
 Tomas Ortved – drums
 Knud Odde – bass guitar
 Steen Jørgensen – vocals, pocket trumpet

Additional musicians and production
 Morten Versner – violin on "Off Morning"
 Lydia Lunch – duet on "Boy-Girl" and lead vocals on "As She Weeps"
 Mogens Bjergby – engineering
 Chris Butler – production

References

Sort Sol albums
1983 albums